Aloeides apicalis, the pointed copper, is a butterfly of the family Lycaenidae. It is found in South Africa, where it is known from Western Cape and the Northern Cape.

The wingspan is 23–27 mm for males and 25–30 mm females. Adults are on wing from September to May in several generations per year.

The larvae are attended by Monomorium fridae ants.

References

Butterflies described in 1968
Aloeides
Endemic butterflies of South Africa